Morgantown Wharf and Warehouse Historic District is a national historic district located at Morgantown, Monongalia County, West Virginia.

Description
The district includes 36 contributing buildings, 1 contributing site, and 2 contributing structures in a formerly industrial area along the Monongahela River and B&O Railroad tracks.  The district consists of primarily two and three-story, masonry buildings with warehouse or commercial facilities on the first floor with some residential on the upper stories, and some worker's housing. Most of the buildings were built between 1885 and 1948. Notable buildings include the B&O Railroad Depot (1885), Kincaid Building (c. 1904–1906), railroad bridge over Deckers Creek (c. 1900–1910), railroad trestle (c. 1900), and wharf site (c. 1847).  Also located in the district is the separately listed Kincaid and Arnett Feed and Flour Building.

It was listed on the National Register of Historic Places in 1998.

References

Historic districts in Monongalia County, West Virginia
Historic districts on the National Register of Historic Places in West Virginia
Industrial buildings and structures on the National Register of Historic Places in West Virginia
Italianate architecture in West Virginia
Buildings and structures in Morgantown, West Virginia
Queen Anne architecture in West Virginia
Romanesque Revival architecture in West Virginia
Warehouses on the National Register of Historic Places
National Register of Historic Places in Monongalia County, West Virginia